Goraganamudi is a village located near Bhimavaram, West Godavari district, Andhra Pradesh. Nuclear Physicist Swami Jnanananda was born in this image. Pennada Agrhrm Railway Station  and Vendra Railway Station are nearest train stations.

Demographics 

 Census of India, Goraganamudi had a population of 2122. The total population constitute, 1069 males and 1053 females with a sex ratio of 985 females per 1000 males. 183 children are in the age group of 0–6 years, with sex ratio of 968. The average literacy rate stands at 84.01%.

References

Villages in West Godavari district